Parageaya is a genus of harvestmen in the family Sclerosomatidae from Latin America.

Species
 Parageaya albifrons C.J.Goodnight & M.L.Goodnight, 1942
 Parageaya bielawskii Starega, 1970
 Parageaya ciliata Mello-Leitão, 1933b
 Parageaya corderoi (Mello-Leitão, 1936)
 Parageaya uruguayensis Ringuelet, 1963
 Parageaya vittatus (Mello-Leitão, 1940)

References

Harvestmen
Harvestman genera